The boys' individual archery competition at the 2014 Youth Summer Olympics took place from 22–26 August in Nanjing, China.

32 archers from 32 countries entered the competition, which consisted of a 72-arrow 60m ranking round followed by a knockout tournament based on the Olympic scoring system, with the archers seeded according to their ranking round score.

Lee Woo-seok set a new world record during the ranking round, scoring 704 of a maximum of 720.

Schedule
All times are UTC+08:00.

Results

Ranking round

Elimination rounds

Finals

Top half

Section 1

Section 2

Bottom half

Section 3

Section 4

References

 

Archery at the 2014 Summer Youth Olympics